Please don't delete this article because this actor or actress is new and will play/is playing a lead, supporting or breakthrough role in the tokusatsu series "Kamen Rider Build" and will continue their career and make more roles, either lead or supporting, after the end of the programme.

 is a Japanese actress and tarento who has appeared in a number of television series and variety shows. She is represented by the agency Production Ogi.

In 2014, she won the 31st All-Japan Ninja Championship Tournament. In 2016, she finished the Yokohama Marathon in five hours.

Filmography

TV dramas

TV programmes

Advertisements

Events

References

External links
 
 Powered by Line - Line Blog 
 

21st-century Japanese actresses
Japanese television personalities
People from Tokyo
1996 births
Living people